Mohamed Enver Surty  (born 15 August 1953) is a South African politician who served as the Deputy Minister of Basic Education in the cabinet of President Cyril Ramaphosa from 2009 till 2019. He is a member of the African National Congress.

A lawyer by education, he served as Deputy Minister of Education from April 2004 till September 2008. He was deployed to the Ministry of Justice and Constitutional Development in September 2008 serving as Minister until 2009. Appointed to the post of Deputy Minister of Basic Education by President Jacob Zuma, he continued in that position under Cyril Ramaphosa.

Surty was born on 15 August 1953. He holds Bachelor of Arts degree from University of Durban-Westville, Honours degree (Philosophy), and BProc degree from University of South Africa (UNISA). He completed an LLM degree in Constitutional Litigation from University of the Western Cape (UWC) in 1996 and a Postgraduate Certificate in Higher education. He was admitted as Attorney in 1977 and practiced as an attorney and human Rights Lawyer in Rustenburg from 1977 until 1994. He became a Minister of Justice and Constitutional Development from September 2008 to May 2009, but also had served as Member of Parliament from 1994 until 2004. He was a member of the Management Committee of the Constitutional Assembly and negotiator for the ANC on the Bill of Rights.

See also

African Commission on Human and Peoples' Rights
Constitution of South Africa
History of the African National Congress
Politics in South Africa
Provincial governments of South Africa

References

1953 births
Living people
African National Congress politicians
Justice ministers of South Africa
South African politicians of Indian descent
University of the Western Cape alumni
Members of the National Assembly of South Africa